Tasmaphena is a genus of medium-sized, predatory, air-breathing land snails, carnivorous terrestrial pulmonate gastropod mollusks in the family Rhytididae.

Species
Species within the genus Tasmaphena include:
 Tasmaphena sinclairi (Pfeiffer, 1846)
 Tasmaphena lamproides  (Cox, 1868)
 Tasmaphena ruga (Legrand, 1871)

References

 OBIS info

Rhytididae
Taxonomy articles created by Polbot